Rajoo Bhatkal (born 1 September 1985) is an Indian former first-class cricketer. He played as a right-handed batsman and right-arm medium pace bowler for Karnataka in the Ranji Trophy, one day games and Inter-State T20 tournament. Other teams he played for included Malnad Gladiators and IPL Franchise Royal Challengers Bangalore.

He made his Ranji debut in 2006–07 against Saurashta at Rajkot, scoring 42 runs batting at number nine and taking three wickets for 53 runs.
He made his debut with Royal Challengers Bangalore on 29 September 2011, scoring 25 runs in 18 balls.

References 

Indian cricketers
Karnataka cricketers
Royal Challengers Bangalore cricketers
Living people
1985 births
People from Belgaum
Cricketers from Karnataka